Galatasaray Spor Kulübü is a professional football club based in Istanbul, that competes in Süper Lig, the most senior football league in Turkey. The club was formed in 1905 as Galata-Serai Football Club and played its first friendly match on 10 November 1905. Galatasaray managed to win its first ever match, when they beat Faure Mektebi 2–0.
Galatasaray played its first competitive match on 25 November 1906, when it drew 1–1 in the first week of the 1906–07 Istanbul Football League against HMS Imogene FC.
Initially Galatasaray played against other local clubs in various Istanbul tournaments, but in 1959 the club became one of the founding members of Süper Lig, Turkey's first national league.
Galatasaray is one of the founding members of the Turkish Super Lig in 1959 and is one of only three clubs never to have been relegated from the top level of Turkish football, the others being the archrival Fenerbahçe and Beşiktaş.

Galatasaray's most successful spell was in the 1999–2000 season, where they won not only the Süper Lig and Turkish Cup, but also the UEFA Cup by defeating English club Arsenal in the final of the latter.

The club has won the Süper Lig championship a record 22 times, the Turkish Cup a record 18 times, the Turkish Super Cup a record 15 times, the UEFA Europa League one time and the UEFA Super Cup one time.
The table details the club's achievements in the early regional championships and in all national and international first-team competitions for each completed season since the club's formation in 1905.

Key

Key to league:
 Pos = Final position
 Pld = Matches played
 W = Matches won
 D = Matches drawn
 L = Matches lost
 GF = Goals scored
 GA = Goals against
 Pts = Points

Key to divisions and rounds:
 C = Champions
 F = Final (Runners-up)
 SF = Semi-finals
 QF = Quarter-finals
 R16/R32 = Round of 16, round of 32, etc.
 GS = Group stage
 POR = Play-off round
 3QR = 3rd qualifying round
 5R = 5th round

List of seasons

References

External links
 Galatasaray Sports Club Official Website

Seasons
 
Turkish football club seasons
Istanbul-related lists
Association football in Turkey lists